Jonathan Dally is a former professional American football quarterback. A dual-threat, Dally played college football at Cal Poly and later was the co-MVP for both the 2014 and 2015 Italian bowl championship games in the Italian Football League. Dally also played in the Austrian Football League.

Early life 
Dally played high school football at Ernest Righetti High in Santa Maria, California. He earned All-Pac 5 League honors as a junior and senior quarterback, while also playing defensive back for the Warriors.

Collegiate career 
Standing 6-foot-1 and 180 pounds, Dally played his first two college seasons at Allan Hancock College in Santa Maria, before signing a National Letter of Intent in December 2006 to transfer to Cal Poly University, an FCS program in San Luis Obispo, California. As a sophomore, he was selected to the All-Western State Conference Team and earned AHC's Team MVP award.

Despite playing only two seasons at Cal Poly, Dally's combined 75 passing and rushing touchdowns totaled a school career record, which would later be matched by Chris Brown. In a 2007 game against Weber State, Dally set a program record for touchdown passes in a game, with six, and tied the single-game record in 2008 versus Southern Utah. In 2008, his passer-efficiency rating of 171.6 led the country at the FCS level. Following the 2008 regular season, Dally was selected to the All-Great West Conference First Team and received two write-in votes for seven total points in the balloting for the Walter Payton Award.

Professional career 
In 2011, Dally started his pro career playing for the Milano Rhinos in the Italian Football League.

For the 2012-2013 seasons, Dally signed with the Danube Dragons of the Austrian Football League in February 2012, and played with the club through 2013. The Dragons reached the Austrian league playoffs both seasons.

In 2014 Dally returned to the Italian Football League, signing with the Milano Seamen, Dally was selected as co-MVP of the 2014 Italian Bowl. He also quarterbacked Milano to a repeat title in 2015, again earning the co-MVP honor as the Seamen defeated the Parma Panthers 24–14 in the XXXV edition of the game, held at Stadio Vigorelli.

As the Seamen finished 11–1 in 2014, Dally surpassed 30 touchdown passes and added six rushing touchdowns for the season.

References 

Living people
American football quarterbacks
Cal Poly Mustangs football players
Allan Hancock Bulldogs football players
Players of American football from California
People from Santa Maria, California
Year of birth missing (living people)
American expatriate players of American football
American expatriate sportspeople in Austria
American expatriate sportspeople in Italy